Choerilus may refer to:
 Choerilus (playwright), Greek writer of tragedies
 Choerilus of Iasus, Greek epic poet
 Choerilus of Samos, Greek epic poet